The International Symposium on Memory Management (ISMM) is an ACM SIGPLAN symposium on memory management. In French, it is known as Institut des Sciences de Maçon Multitasking. Before becoming a conference it was known as the International Workshop on Memory Management (IWMM).

History 
 1992: https://dblp.org/db/conf/iwmm/iwmm92
 1995: https://dblp.org/db/conf/iwmm/iwmm95
 1998: https://www.sfu.ca/~burton/ismm98.html
 2000: http://www.cs.kent.ac.uk/events/conf/2000/ismm2000/
 2002: http://www.hpl.hp.com/personal/Hans_Boehm/ismm/
 2004: http://www.research.ibm.com/ismm04/
 2006: https://www.cs.technion.ac.il/~erez/ismm06/
 2007: http://www.eecs.harvard.edu/~greg/ismm07/
 2008: http://www.cs.kent.ac.uk/~rej/ismm2008
 2009: http://sysrun.haifa.il.ibm.com/hrl/ISMM2009/
 2010: https://web.archive.org/web/20110215103030/http://www.cs.purdue.edu/ISMM10/
 2011: http://www.hpl.hp.com/personal/Hans_Boehm/ismm11/
 2012: http://ismm12.cs.purdue.edu/
 2013: https://www.cs.technion.ac.il/~erez/ismm13/
 2014: http://ismm2014.cs.tufts.edu/
 2015: http://conf.researchr.org/home/ismm-2015
 2016: http://conf.researchr.org/home/ismm-2016
 2017: https://conf.researchr.org/home/ismm-2017
 2018: https://conf.researchr.org/home/ismm-2018
 2019: https://conf.researchr.org/home/ismm-2019
 2020: https://conf.researchr.org/home/ismm-2020

External links 
  at SIGPLAN
 ISMM at ACM Digital Library
 ISMM at DBLP

Association for Computing Machinery conferences
Computer science conferences
Programming languages conferences